The Silver Island Range, also called the Silver Island Mountains, is a mountain range in Utah, United States, situated the northwest corner of Tooele County and the southwest corner of Box Elder County, about  northeast of Wendover.

The Silver Island Range lies at the west perimeter of the Great Salt Lake Desert; the southeast flank of the range is on the northwest border of the Bonneville Salt Flats.

Geography 
The Silver Island Range is a rough triangular area which extends  into Utah from the Utah - Nevada border, with the Pilot Valley Playa to the west and the Great Salt Lake Desert to the east. The wilderness area includes  with sloping stream terraces, foothills, canyons, and steep mountains. Other peaks include Tetzlaff Peak, Rishel Peak, and Volcano Peak. With no perennial streams, vegetation on the rocky slopes is sparse, consisting of juniper, sagebrush, ricegrass and ephedra along with other desert shrubs and grasses.

Geology
Bedrock in the range includes faulted and folded fossil bearing limestones. The slopes of the range have been terraced by shoreline erosion and deposition from Lake Bonneville.

History 
Historically, several caves in the Silver Island Range served as habitation for Native Americans. The range also played a role in the more recent mining history of the region, and stood as both a barrier and landmark to pioneers who crossed the inhospitable Salt Lake Desert. Donner Canyon in the northeast section of the range bears the name of the Donner-Reed party, who passed north of the area on the Hastings Cutoff.

Modern uses
The Silver Island Range is used for all-terrain vehicle driving, camping, caving, hiking, hunting, mining, and rockhounding.

References

External links

 Silver Island Mountain National Back Country Byway

 

Great Salt Lake Desert
Mountain ranges of the Great Basin
Mountain ranges of Box Elder County, Utah
Mountain ranges of Tooele County, Utah
Mountain ranges of Utah